Hope and Glory may refer to:

 Hope and Glory (film), a 1987 film written and directed by John Boorman
 Hope and Glory (TV series), a British television drama
 Hope & Glory (album), an album by Ann Wilson of Heart
 "Hope & Glory" (song), a song by Swedish singer Måns Zelmerlöw
 Hope and Glory, a 1984 album or the title song by Tom Robinson

See also
 "Land of Hope and Glory", a British patriotic song